Moila Bugyal also known as Moila Top is a bugyal (Himalayan Alpine Meadows) in the Dehradun district of Uttarakhand. Moila Bugyal is a hiking and camping Destination. The Bugyal has the highest elevation of 2759m and is around 40 km from Chakrata. Moila Bugyal is situated between thousands of Deodar trees. The trek  to the Bugyal is of 3 km and starts from Budher Forest Rest House, which is around 30 km from Chakrata.

Budher Caves, situated at the corner of the Bugyal, believed to be built by the Pandavas is also a place to visit. Also, a historic temple dedicated to Lord Shiva is located at the centre of the Bugyal.
The glorious views of the Garhwal Himalayas can be seen from here.

References

Geography of Dehradun